Amor y Control is the eleventh studio album by Panamian singer Rubén Blades and the sixth album with his Band Son Del Solar released on September 22, 1992 through CBS Records International. Featuring a variety of Caribbean and Latin American musical genres, which reached #14 on the Billboard Tropical/Salsa charts and received a nomination for Grammy Award for best Tropical Latin Album. 

The album had three outstanding songs that are "Amor Y Control", "Adán García" and "Creo en Ti" which had a video clip, there is also a reversion of the song Baby's in Black" by the English rock pop band The Beatles originally released on December 4, 1964 for their Beatles for Sale album. The five singles from the album were "Creo en Tí", "Piensa en Mí", "West Indan Man", "Baby's in Black" and "El Apagón".

Track listing

Certification

References

1992 albums
Rubén Blades albums